Lynch By Inch (Suicide Note) is the fifth studio album by American rapper Brotha Lynch Hung, released through his own Siccmade Music label on June 10, 2003 as a double album and follow-up to The Virus.  It is his first solo album not released on Black Market Records.

Overview
Lynch By Inch (Suicide Note) is the first concept album from rapper Brotha Lynch Hung. Inspired by the (at the time) recent passing of his mother, as noted in the accompanying booklet underneath a picture of her: "You are my inspiration." The album chronicles the depression and events leading up to a fictional suicide attempt by the protagonist.

Track listing

Personnel
Brotha Lynch Hung – vocals, production, co-executive producer

Recording personnel
Phonk Beta – production, project management
Eric Broyhill – mastering
A.J. – recording, mixing

Additional personnel
Art B – co-executive producer
Loki – photography, layout, CD artwork & design
Tallcann G – A&R, project management
E-Moe – project management
Upheaval – photography

References

Brotha Lynch Hung albums
2003 albums
Concept albums